Sydney Sandpipers  were an Australian netball team based in Sydney. Between 1997 and 2003, they represented Netball New South Wales in the Commonwealth Bank Trophy league. Together with Sydney Swifts and Hunter Jaegers, they were one of three teams to represent  NNSW in the competition. In 1997 Sandpipers were founder members of the league. They continued to play in the competition until 2003, when they were replaced by Hunter Jaegers.

Commonwealth Bank Trophy 
Between 1997 and 2003, Sydney Sandpipers played in the Commonwealth Bank Trophy league. Together with Adelaide Ravens, Adelaide Thunderbirds, Melbourne Kestrels, Melbourne Phoenix, Perth Orioles, Queensland Firebirds and Sydney Swifts, Sandpipers were one of the founding members of the league. The majority of the teams were named after native Australian birds. The team was initially referred to as Sydney Eagles before been re-named Sydney Sandpipers after the sandpiper. Together with Sydney Swifts and Hunter Jaegers, Sandpipers were one of three teams to represent Netball New South Wales in the competition.  

Sydney Sandpipers best performance in the league came in 2000. With a team featuring Natalie Avellino and Joanne Morgan, they finished third in the regular season, above their neighbours, Sydney Swifts. Sandpipers continued to play in the competition until 2003. NNSW withdrew the team from the competition, saying it was unable to support a second Sydney-based team. NNSW  successfully applied to replace Sandpipers with a new team based outside the Sydney metropolitan area and in 2004 they were replaced by the Newcastle-based Hunter Jaegers.

Regular season statistics

Home venues
In 1997 Sandpipers played their home games at the Anne Clark Netball Centre in Lidcombe. In 1998 they moved to the State Sports Centre.

Notable former players

Internationals

 

 Abby Teare

Captains

Notes 
  In 2001 and 2002, Joanne Morgan and Natalie Avellino were co-captains.

Most Appearances

Award Winners
Best New Talent

Head coaches

Sponsorship

References

Defunct netball teams in Australia
Netball teams in Sydney
Commonwealth Bank Trophy teams
Sports clubs established in 1996
1996 establishments in Australia
2003 disestablishments in Australia
Sports clubs disestablished in 2003